Jasmin Burić (born 18 February 1987) is a Bosnian professional footballer who plays as a goalkeeper for Ekstraklasa club Zagłębie Lubin.

Burić started his professional career at Čelik Zenica, before joining Lech Poznań in 2009. Ten years later, he moved to Hapoel Haifa. In 2022, he signed with Zagłębie Lubin.

A former youth international for Bosnia and Herzegovina, Burić made his senior international debut in 2008, earning 3 caps until 2020.

Club career

Early career
Burić came through youth academy of his hometown club Čelik Zenica. He made his professional debut in 2005 at the age of 18.

Lech Poznań
In January 2009, Burić was transferred to Polish team Lech Poznań for an undisclosed fee. He won his first trophy with the club on 19 May, by beating Ruch Chorzów in Polish Cup final. On 18 October, he made his official debut for the side against Wisła Kraków.

In July 2012, he extended his contract until June 2016.

Burić played his 100th game for the team against Lechia Gdańsk on 25 July 2015.

In January 2016, he signed a new three-year deal with the club.

He made his 200th appearance for the side on 10 March 2019 against Miedź Legnica.

Later stage of career
In June, Burić moved to Israeli outfit Hapoel Haifa.

In January 2022, he joined Zagłębie Lubin.

International career
Burić represented Bosnia and Herzegovina at all youth levels.

In May 2008, he received his first senior call-up, for a friendly game against Azerbaijan, and debuted in that game on 1 June.

Personal life
Burić married his long-time girlfriend Lejla in May 2016.

He possesses Polish passport since 2017.

Career statistics

Club

International

Honours
Lech Poznań
Ekstraklasa: 2009–10, 2014–15
Polish Cup: 2008–09
Polish Super Cup: 2009, 2015, 2016

References

External links

1987 births
Living people
Sportspeople from Zenica
Bosniaks of Bosnia and Herzegovina
Bosnia and Herzegovina Muslims
Naturalized citizens of Poland
Bosnia and Herzegovina footballers
Bosnia and Herzegovina youth international footballers
Bosnia and Herzegovina under-21 international footballers
Bosnia and Herzegovina international footballers
Bosnia and Herzegovina expatriate footballers
Association football goalkeepers
NK Čelik Zenica players
Lech Poznań players
Hapoel Haifa F.C. players
Zagłębie Lubin players
Premier League of Bosnia and Herzegovina players
Ekstraklasa players
Israeli Premier League players
Expatriate footballers in Poland
Expatriate footballers in Israel
Bosnia and Herzegovina expatriate sportspeople in Poland
Bosnia and Herzegovina expatriate sportspeople in Israel